Propylaea may refer to:

 Propylaea (Acropolis of Athens)
 Propylaea (Munich)
 Propylaea (sculpture)
 Propylaea (University of Athens)
 The Propylaeum